Macrenches clerica is a moth of the family Gelechiidae. It is known from Australia, where it has been recorded from Tasmania and south-eastern mainland Australia.

The forewings are dark bronzy-fuscous with a broad ochreous-whitish costal streak from the base to near the apex, mixed with light fuscous towards the costa from the middle to near the extremity. There is a similar dorsal streak from near the base to the termen near the apex, more or less suffused with fuscous posteriorly, sometimes tinged with brassy-yellowish on the upper edge anteriorly. The hindwings are grey or pale grey, paler anteriorly.

References

Moths described in 1885
Thiotrichinae